The U.S. Civil Service Commission Building is a 1911 six story brick building near the White House in Washington D.C.  It housed the Civil Service Commission from 1911 to 1932.  It currently houses various offices for the Executive Branch and the U.S Trade Representatives.  Unlike many federal buildings of the time, it was built by a private developer for the government.

References

Foggy Bottom
Government buildings completed in 1911
Government buildings on the National Register of Historic Places in Washington, D.C.
1911 establishments in Washington, D.C.